Grzybów may refer to:

Grzybów, Łódź Voivodeship (central Poland)
Grzybów, Subcarpathian Voivodeship (south-east Poland)
Grzybów, Końskie County in Świętokrzyskie Voivodeship (south-central Poland)
Grzybów, Gmina Staszów in Świętokrzyskie Voivodeship (south-central Poland)
Grzybów, Gmina Bogoria in Świętokrzyskie Voivodeship (south-central Poland)
Grzybów, Kozienice County in Masovian Voivodeship (east-central Poland)
Grzybów, Łosice County in Masovian Voivodeship (east-central Poland)
Grzybów, Płock County in Masovian Voivodeship (east-central Poland)

See also
Grybów